The Coello River is a river in Tolima Department of Colombia. It drains into the Caribbean Sea via the Magdalena River.

See also
List of rivers of Colombia

References

Rivers of Colombia